The Derveni Tunnels are two contiguous tunnels on the Patras - Corinth section of the Olympia Odos motorway. They bypass the coastal town of Derveni, located near the border with the Achaea regional unit. Works began in 2008 along with the whole motorway, but they were halted in 2011. They were again resumed in early 2014. It was opened to traffic on September 2, 2016, the same day of the opening of the Ancient Corinth-Kiato segment.

References

Corinth
Road tunnels in Greece